Robail is a surname. Notable people with the surname include:

 Gaëtan Robail (born 1994), French footballer
 Mathieu Robail (born 1985), French footballer
 Samuel Robail (born 1985), French footballer
 Robail Yasrab (born 1992), Oxford University AI Researcher

French-language surnames